Halsou is a commune in the Pyrénées-Atlantiques department in south-western France. Halsou-Larressore station has rail connections to Saint-Jean-Pied-de-Port, Cambo-les-Bains and Bayonne. The town's mayor is Philippe Masse, elected in 2020.

See also
Communes of the Pyrénées-Atlantiques department

References

Communes of Pyrénées-Atlantiques
Pyrénées-Atlantiques communes articles needing translation from French Wikipedia